The Institute for Biblical Research established in 1973 is "an organization of evangelical Christian scholars with specialties in Old and New Testament and in ancillary disciplines". It describes its vision as "to foster excellence in the pursuit of Biblical Studies within a faith environment."  It pursues these goals by means of publications, workshops and conferences.

History
The IBR was established under the leadership of E. Earle Ellis, the organisation's founding chair from 1973 to 1981. The original intention was the establishment of a North American-based residential reference library similar to that of the Tyndale Fellowship for Biblical Research, Tyndale House Library, Cambridge, England. From 1970 to its establishment, a number of scholars calling themselves the Tyndale Committee discussed the viability of creating a residential library, concluding that it would require an associated society, which came with the establishment of the IBR in 1973.

By 2006, the IBR had 521 members composed of 412 Fellows, 41 Associates, 32 Friends and 36 Retired members.

Presidents 
Since foundation, the IBR presidents have been:

Publications
In 1989 the IBR launched the Bulletin for Biblical Research (BBR) under the editorship of Bruce Chilton, published by Eisenbrauns. The current editor is Craig S. Keener.

The BBR Supplement Series was established in 2007 and published monographs. Since 1992, Baker Book House published a series of IBR-sponsored bibliographies on topics such as the Historical Jesus, Old Testament Introduction, New Testament Introduction, the Pentateuch and the Pauline Letters.

References

External links
 

Biblical studies organizations
Early Christianity and Judaism
Christian organizations established in 1973
1973 establishments in the United States